New National Stadium may refer to:

 New Laos National Stadium
 New National Stadium (Tokyo)